Gwynedd is an unincorporated community in Lower Gwynedd Township in Montgomery County, Pennsylvania, United States. Gwynedd is located at the intersection of U.S. Route 202 and Sumneytown Pike.

Notable person
Warder Cresson

References

Unincorporated communities in Montgomery County, Pennsylvania
Unincorporated communities in Pennsylvania